is a passenger railway station in located in the city of Katano, Osaka Prefecture, Japan, operated by the private railway company Keihan Electric Railway.

Lines
Kisaichi Station is a terminus of the  Keihan Katano Line, and is located 6.9 kilometers from the opposing terminus of the line at Hirakatashi Station.

Station layout
The station has two ground-level dead-headed side platforms.

Platforms

Adjacent stations

History
The station was opened on July 10, 1929.

Passenger statistics
In fiscal 2019, the station was used by an average of 3,121 passengers daily.

Surrounding area
 
 Botanical Gardens Faculty of Science Osaka City University

See also
List of railway stations in Japan

References

External links

Official home page 

Railway stations in Osaka Prefecture
Railway stations in Japan opened in 1929
Katano, Osaka